Tetrapterys is a genus of flowering plants in the family Malpighiaceae, native to Latin America and the Caribbean, from Mexico through to Argentina, but excluding Chile. Small trees, shrubs or vines, they are known to be toxic to livestock if consumed for long periods of time, and T.mucronata and T.styloptera (formerly T.methystica) have hallucinogenic effects in humans similar to ayahuasca.

Species
Currently accepted species include:

Tetrapterys acapulcensis Kunth
Tetrapterys aequalis C.Wright
Tetrapterys amazonica C.E.Anderson
Tetrapterys ambigua (A.Juss.) Nied.
Tetrapterys andersonii C.E.Anderson
Tetrapterys anisoptera A.Juss.
Tetrapterys anomala W.R.Anderson
Tetrapterys arcana C.V.Morton
Tetrapterys argentea Bertol.
Tetrapterys aristeguietae W.R.Anderson
Tetrapterys benthamii Triana & Planch.
Tetrapterys buxifolia Cav.
Tetrapterys callejasii W.R.Anderson
Tetrapterys calophylla A.Juss.
Tetrapterys cardiophylla Nied.
Tetrapterys chamaecerasifolia A.Juss.
Tetrapterys chloroptera Cuatrec.
Tetrapterys citrifolia (Sw.) Pers.
Tetrapterys complicata Moq.
Tetrapterys cordifolia W.R.Anderson
Tetrapterys crispa A.Juss.
Tetrapterys crotonifolia A.Juss.
Tetrapterys dillonii W.R.Anderson
Tetrapterys diptera Cuatrec.
Tetrapterys discolor (G.Mey.) DC.
Tetrapterys fimbripetala A.Juss.
Tetrapterys goudotiana Triana & Planch.
Tetrapterys gracilis W.R.Anderson
Tetrapterys haitiensis Urb. & Nied.
Tetrapterys hassleriana Nied.
Tetrapterys helianthemifolia Griseb.
Tetrapterys heterophylla (Griseb.) W.R.Anderson
Tetrapterys hirsutula Cuatrec. & Croat
Tetrapterys humilis A.Juss.
Tetrapterys inaequalis Cav.
Tetrapterys jamesonii Turcz.
Tetrapterys jussieuana Nied.
Tetrapterys longibracteata A.Juss.
Tetrapterys magnifolia Ruiz ex Griseb.
Tetrapterys maranhamensis A.Juss.
Tetrapterys megalantha W.R.Anderson
Tetrapterys mexicana Hook. & Arn.
Tetrapterys microphylla (A.Juss.) Nied.
Tetrapterys molinae W.R.Anderson
Tetrapterys mollis Griseb.
Tetrapterys monteverdensis W.R.Anderson
Tetrapterys mortonii (J.F.Macbr.) Cuatrec.
Tetrapterys mucronata Cav.
Tetrapterys natans W.R.Anderson
Tetrapterys nelsonii Rose
Tetrapterys nitida A.Juss.
Tetrapterys oleifolia (Benth.) Griseb.
Tetrapterys paludosa A.Juss.
Tetrapterys papyracea Triana & Planch.
Tetrapterys phlomoides (Spreng.) Nied.
Tetrapterys pohliana Nied.
Tetrapterys pusilla Steyerm.
Tetrapterys racemulosa A.Juss.
Tetrapterys ramiflora A.Juss.
Tetrapterys rhodopteron (Oliv.) Oliv.
Tetrapterys rzedowskii W.R.Anderson
Tetrapterys salicifolia (A.Juss.) Nied.
Tetrapterys schiedeana Schltdl. & Cham.
Tetrapterys seemannii Triana & Planch.
Tetrapterys seleriana Nied.
Tetrapterys skutchii W.R.Anderson
Tetrapterys splendens Cuatrec.
Tetrapterys steyermarkii W.R.Anderson
Tetrapterys stipulacea J.F.Macbr.
Tetrapterys styloptera A.Juss. ← Tetrapterys methystica R.E.Schult.
Tetrapterys subaptera Cuatrec.
Tetrapterys tinifolia Triana & Planch.
Tetrapterys tolimensis Sprague
Tetrapterys turnerae Mart. ex A.Juss.
Tetrapterys tysonii Cuatrec. & Croat
Tetrapterys vacciniifolia A.Juss.
Tetrapterys xylosteifolia A.Juss.

References

Malpighiaceae
Malpighiaceae genera
Taxa named by Antonio José Cavanilles